The Princess and the Matchmaker is a 2018 South Korean period romantic comedy-drama film directed by Hong Chang-pyo. The film stars Shim Eun-kyung, Lee Seung-gi, Kim Sang-kyung, Yeon Woo-jin, Kang Min-hyuk, Choi Woo-shik and Jo Bok-rae. The film tells story of a saju expert, Seo Do-yoon, who received an order from the King to help him pick a husband for his daughter, Princess Song-hwa, based on their fortune. It is the second installment of Jupiter Film's three-part film project on the Korean fortune-telling traditions, following The Face Reader which was released in 2013 and followed by Feng Shui later in 2018.

Plot
Princess Songhwa of the Joseon era refuses her fate to marry one of four suitors deemed to have good marital compatibility with her. She then escapes from the palace to find the man she truly loves.

Cast

Main
Shim Eun-kyung as Princess Songhwa
Lee Han-seo as Young Princess Songhwa
Lee Seung-gi as Seo Do-yoon
The fortune-teller
Yeon Woo-jin as Yoon Shi-kyung
 First candidate for Princess Song-hwa's husband. He is an ambitious man of ability.
Kang Min-hyuk as Kang Hwi 
 Second candidate for Princess Song-hwa's husband who is a gifted man with good looks.
Choi Woo-shik as Nam Chi-ho
 Third candidate for Princess Song-hwa's husband, a warm and a polite man known for his filial piety.

Supporting

Kim Sang-kyung as King
Jo Bok-rae as Gae-shi 
Park Sun-young as Young-bin
Lee Yoon-gun as Park In
Kim Do-yeop as Jo Yoo-sang
Kim Joo-hun as Yook Son 
Han Sung-yun as Song-hwa
Park Choong-sun as Eunuch Jang
Cho Soo-hyang as Man-yi 
Lee Na-yoon as Young Man-yi
Kim Do-yeop as Jo Yoo-sang
Lee Yong-nyeo as Court lady Han
Joo Da-young as Princess Yeo-hee
Min Areum as Princess 3
Son Seong-chan as Judge 2
Park Won-ho as Sang-moon
Lee Jung-hyun as Ugly man 1
Yoon Yoo-sun as Eu'ahri 
Song Yeong-jae as Royal Observatory professor 
Song Kwang-won as Princess 1's suitor
Lee Sun-bin as Princess 1
Han Ji-an as Gisaeng 1
Ahn Ji-ho as Deok-goo

Special appearance
Choi Min-ho as Seo Ga-yoon
Park Jin-joo as Ok-hee

Production 
Principal photography began on September 9, 2015 and wrapped on December 23, 2015.

Release 
On January 31, 2018, a promotional press conference was held with the main cast and the director at the event. The main trailer for the film was unveiled on February 9, 2018. The Princess and the Matchmaker was released in the local cinemas on February 28, 2018.

Reception 
According to Korean Film Council, The Princess and the Matchmaker topped the local box office on the first day of its release and attracted 175,022 audiences.

During the first weekend since the film was released at 965 screens, The Princess and the Matchmaker drew 489,702 moviegoers accounting for 29.1 percent of the weekend's ticket sales.

The film maintained the number one spot for six consecutive days since its release and surpassed one million viewers on its seventh day.

During the second weekend the film was viewed by 157,084 audiences and fell to fourth place at the Korean box office.

References

External links

2018 romantic comedy-drama films
2010s historical romance films
South Korean romantic comedy-drama films
CJ Entertainment films
South Korean historical romance films
2010s South Korean films